Çetinkaya is a Turkish surname. In English 'çetin' means 'hard' and 'kaya' means 'rock'.

Notable people with the surname include

Ali Çetinkaya (1878–1949), Turkish Army officer
Burcu Çetinkaya (born 1981), Turkish female rally driver and television representer 
Duygu Çetinkaya, Actress 
Hasan Cetinkaya, Swedish footballer
Hikmet Çetinkaya, Cumhuriyet newspaper author
Kelime Çetinkaya (born 1982), Turkish female cross country skier
Meral Çetinkaya (born 1945), Turkish film actress
Murat Çetinkaya (born 1976), Governor of the Central Bank of Turkey
Necati Çetinkaya (born 1943), Member of Parliament
Olcay Çetinkaya (born 1979), Turkish footballer

Other uses
Afyon Ali Çetinkaya railway station, a railway station in Afyonkarahisar, Turkey
Çetinkaya, Sivas, a village in the Kangal district of the Sivas Province
Çetinkaya station, a railway station in the village.
Çetinkaya Türk S.K., Turkish Cypriot football club

Turkish-language surnames